Eumorphocorystes is a genus of crab belonging to the Raninidae subfamily Notopodinae. Fossils of the genus have been found in the Late Cretaceous (Maastrichtian) Maastricht Formation of the Netherlands. Rathbun referred specimens from the Oligocene Stepovak Formation of Alaska to this genus.

References

Crabs
Prehistoric Malacostraca
Prehistoric crustacean genera
Late Cretaceous crustaceans
Eocene crustaceans
Oligocene crustaceans
Maastrichtian genus first appearances
Oligocene genus extinctions
Cretaceous–Paleogene boundary
Fossils of Alaska
Fossil taxa described in 1857
Paleocene crustaceans
Oligocene Alaska
Cretaceous Netherlands
Late Cretaceous arthropods of Europe
Oligocene arthropods of North America